In calculus, and more generally in mathematical analysis, integration by parts or partial integration is a process that finds the integral of a product of functions in terms of the integral of the product of their derivative and antiderivative. It is frequently used to transform the antiderivative of a product of functions into an antiderivative for which a solution can be more easily found. The rule can be thought of as an integral version of the product rule of differentiation.

The integration by parts formula states:

Mathematician Brook Taylor discovered integration by parts, first publishing the idea in 1715. More general formulations of integration by parts exist for the Riemann–Stieltjes and Lebesgue–Stieltjes integrals. The discrete analogue for sequences is called summation by parts.

Theorem

Product of two functions
The theorem can be derived as follows. For two continuously differentiable functions u(x) and v(x), the product rule states:

Integrating both sides with respect to x,

and noting that an indefinite integral is an antiderivative gives

where we neglect writing the constant of integration. This yields the formula for integration by parts:

or in terms of the differentials , 

This is to be understood as an equality of functions with an unspecified constant added to each side. Taking the difference of each side between two values x = a and x = b and applying the fundamental theorem of calculus gives the definite integral version:

The original integral ∫ uv′ dx contains the derivative v′; to apply the theorem, one must find v, the antiderivative of v', then evaluate the resulting integral ∫ vu′ dx.

Validity for less smooth functions
It is not necessary for u and v to be continuously differentiable. Integration by parts works if u is absolutely continuous and the function designated v′ is Lebesgue integrable (but not necessarily continuous). (If v′ has a point of discontinuity then its antiderivative v may not have a derivative at that point.)

If the interval of integration is not compact, then it is not necessary for u to be absolutely continuous in the whole interval or for v′ to be Lebesgue integrable in the interval, as a couple of examples (in which u and v are continuous and continuously differentiable) will show. For instance, if

u is not absolutely continuous on the interval , but nevertheless

This is only true if we choose  Similarly, if

v′ is not Lebesgue integrable on the interval , but nevertheless

with the same interpretation.

One can also easily come up with similar examples in which u and v are not continuously differentiable.

Product of many functions

Integrating the product rule for three multiplied functions, u(x), v(x), w(x), gives a similar result:

In general, for n factors

which leads to

Visualization

Consider a parametric curve by (x, y) = (f(t), g(t)). Assuming that the curve is locally one-to-one and integrable, we can define

The area of the blue region is

Similarly, the area of the red region is

The total area A1 + A2 is equal to the area of the bigger rectangle, x2y2, minus the area of the smaller one, x1y1:

Or, in terms of t,

Or, in terms of indefinite integrals, this can be written as

Rearranging:

Thus integration by parts may be thought of as deriving the area of the blue region from the area of rectangles and that of the red region.

This visualization also explains why integration by parts may help find the integral of an inverse function f−1(x) when the integral of the function f(x) is known. Indeed, the functions x(y) and y(x) are inverses, and the integral ∫ x dy may be calculated as above from knowing the integral ∫ y dx. In particular, this explains use of integration by parts to integrate logarithm and inverse trigonometric functions. This is demonstrated in the article, Integral of inverse functions.

Applications

Finding antiderivatives
Integration by parts is a heuristic rather than a purely mechanical process for solving integrals; given a single function to integrate, the typical strategy is to carefully separate this single function into a product of two functions u(x)v(x) such that the residual integral from the integration by parts formula is easier to evaluate than the single function. The following form is useful in illustrating the best strategy to take:

On the right-hand side, u is differentiated and v is integrated; consequently it is useful to choose u as a function that simplifies when differentiated, or to choose v as a function that simplifies when integrated. As a simple example, consider:

The formula now yields:

Alternatively, one may choose u and v such that the product u′ (∫v dx) simplifies due to cancellation. For example, suppose one wishes to integrate:

If we choose u(x) = ln(|sin(x)|) and v(x) = sec2x, then u differentiates to 1/ tan x using the chain rule and v integrates to tan x; so the formula gives:

The integrand simplifies to 1, so the antiderivative is x. Finding a simplifying combination frequently involves experimentation.

In some applications, it may not be necessary to ensure that the integral produced by integration by parts has a simple form; for example, in numerical analysis, it may suffice that it has small magnitude and so contributes only a small error term. Some other special techniques are demonstrated in the examples below.

Polynomials and trigonometric functions

In order to calculate

let:

then:

where C is a constant of integration.

For higher powers of x in the form

repeatedly using integration by parts can evaluate integrals such as these; each application of the theorem lowers the power of x by one.

Exponentials and trigonometric functions

An example commonly used to examine the workings of integration by parts is

Here, integration by parts is performed twice. First let

then:

Now, to evaluate the remaining integral, we use integration by parts again, with:

Then:

Putting these together,

The same integral shows up on both sides of this equation. The integral can simply be added to both sides to get

which rearranges to

where again C (and C′ = C/2) is a constant of integration.

A similar method is used to find the integral of secant cubed.

Functions multiplied by unity

Two other well-known examples are when integration by parts is applied to a function expressed as a product of 1 and itself. This works if the derivative of the function is known, and the integral of this derivative times x is also known.

The first example is ∫ ln(x) dx. We write this as:

Let:

then:

where C is the constant of integration.

The second example is the inverse tangent function arctan(x):

Rewrite this as

Now let:

then

using a combination of the inverse chain rule method and the natural logarithm integral condition.

LIATE rule
A rule of thumb has been proposed, consisting of choosing as u the function that comes first in the following list:
L – logarithmic functions:  etc.
I – inverse trigonometric functions (including hyperbolic analogues):   etc.
A – algebraic functions:  etc.
T – trigonometric functions (including hyperbolic analogues):  etc.
E – exponential functions:  etc.

The function which is to be dv is whichever comes last in the list. The reason is that functions lower on the list generally have easier antiderivatives than the functions above them. The rule is sometimes written as "DETAIL" where D stands for dv and the top of the list is the function chosen to be dv. 

To demonstrate the LIATE rule, consider the integral

Following the LIATE rule, u = x, and dv = cos(x) dx, hence du = dx, and v = sin(x), which makes the integral become

which equals

In general, one tries to choose u and dv such that du is simpler than u and dv is easy to integrate. If instead cos(x) was chosen as u, and x dx as dv, we would have the integral

which, after recursive application of the integration by parts formula, would clearly result in an infinite recursion and lead nowhere.

Although a useful rule of thumb, there are exceptions to the LIATE rule. A common alternative is to consider the rules in the "ILATE" order instead. Also, in some cases, polynomial terms need to be split in non-trivial ways. For example, to integrate

one would set

so that

Then

Finally, this results in

Integration by parts is often used as a tool to prove theorems in mathematical analysis.

Wallis product 
The Wallis infinite product for 

 

may be derived using integration by parts.

Gamma function identity

Integration by parts illustrates it to be an extension of the factorial function:

Since

when  is a natural number, that is, applying this formula repeatedly gives the factorial:

Use in harmonic analysis

Integration by parts is often used in harmonic analysis, particularly Fourier analysis, to show that quickly oscillating integrals with sufficiently smooth integrands decay quickly. The most common example of this is its use in showing that the decay of function's Fourier transform depends on the smoothness of that function, as described below.

Fourier transform of derivative

If f is a k-times continuously differentiable function and all derivatives up to the kth one decay to zero at infinity, then its Fourier transform satisfies

where  is the kth derivative of f. (The exact constant on the right depends on the convention of the Fourier transform used.) This is proved by noting that

so using integration by parts on the Fourier transform of the derivative we get

Applying this inductively gives the result for general k. A similar method can be used to find the Laplace transform of a derivative of a function.

Decay of Fourier transform

In particular, if  then the Fourier transform is integrable.

The proof uses the fact, which is immediate from the definition of the Fourier transform, that

Using the same idea on the equality stated at the start of this subsection gives

Summing these two inequalities and then dividing by  gives the stated inequality.

Use in operator theory

If f is smooth and compactly supported then, using integration by parts, we have

Other applications

 Determining boundary conditions in Sturm–Liouville theory
 Deriving the Euler–Lagrange equation in the calculus of variations

Repeated integration by parts

Extending this concept of repeated partial integration to derivatives of degree  leads to

The latter condition stops the repeating of partial integration, because the RHS-integral vanishes.

In the course of the above repetition of partial integrations the integrals 
get related.

Tabular integration by parts
The essential process of the above formula can be summarized in a table; the resulting method is called "tabular integration" and was featured in the film Stand and Deliver (1988).

For example, consider the integral

 and take 

Begin to list in column A the function  and its subsequent derivatives  until zero is reached. Then list in column B the function  and its subsequent integrals  until the size of column B is the same as that of column A. The result is as follows:

{| class="wikitable" style="text-align:center"
!# i !! Sign !! A: derivatives u(i)  !! B: integrals v(n−i)
|-
| 0 || + ||  || 
|-
| 1 || − ||  || 
|-
| 2 || + ||  || 
|-
| 3 || − ||  || 
|-
| 4 || + ||  || 
|}

The complete result is the following (with the alternating signs in each term):

This yields

The repeated partial integration also turns out useful, when in the course of respectively differentiating and integrating the functions  and    their product results in a multiple of the original integrand. In this case the repetition may also be terminated with this index This can happen, expectably, with exponentials and trigonometric functions. As an example consider

{| class="wikitable" style="text-align:center"
!# i !! Sign !! A: derivatives u(i) !! B: integrals v(n−i)
|-
| 0 || + ||  || 
|-
| 1 || − ||  || 
|-
| 2 || + ||  || 
|}

In this case the product of the terms in columns A and B with the appropriate sign for index  yields the negative of the original integrand (compare  

Observing that the integral on the RHS can have its own constant of integration , and bringing the abstract integral to the other side, gives

and finally:

where C = C′/2.

Higher dimensions
Integration by parts can be extended to functions of several variables by applying a version of the fundamental theorem of calculus to an appropriate product rule. There are several such pairings possible in multivariate calculus, involving a scalar-valued function u and vector-valued function (vector field) V. 

The product rule for divergence states:

where   is the outward unit normal vector to the boundary, integrated with respect to its standard Riemannian volume form . Rearranging gives:

or in other words

The regularity requirements of the theorem can be relaxed. For instance, the boundary  need only be Lipschitz continuous, and the functions u, v  need only lie in the Sobolev space H1(Ω).

Green's first identity 
Now apply the above integration by parts to each  times the vector field :

Summing over i gives a new integration by parts formula:

The case , where , is known as the first of Green's identities:

See also
 Integration by parts for the Lebesgue–Stieltjes integral
 Integration by parts for semimartingales, involving their quadratic covariation.
 Integration by substitution
 Legendre transformation

Notes

Further reading

External links

 
 Integration by parts—from MathWorld

Integral calculus
Mathematical identities
Theorems in analysis
Theorems in calculus

es:Métodos de integración#Método de integración por partes